Acquired situational narcissism (ASN) is a form of narcissism that develops in late adolescence or adulthood, brought on by wealth, fame and the other trappings of celebrity. It was coined by Robert B. Millman, professor of psychiatry at the Weill Cornell Medical College of Cornell University.

ASN differs from conventional narcissism in that it develops after childhood and is triggered and supported by the celebrity-obsessed society: fans, assistants and tabloid media all play into the idea that the person really is vastly more important than other people, triggering a narcissistic problem that might have been only a tendency, or latent, and helping it to become a full-blown personality disorder. "Millman says that what happens to celebrities is that they get so used to people looking at them that they stop looking back at other people."

In its presentation and symptoms, it is indistinguishable from narcissistic personality disorder, differing only in its late onset and its support by large numbers of others. "The lack of social norms, controls, and of people telling them how life really is, also makes these people believe they're invulnerable," so that the person with ASN may suffer from unstable relationships, substance abuse and erratic behaviour.

A famous fictional character with ASN is Norma Desmond, the main character of Sunset Boulevard.

References

Narcissism